Luka Jarčov (born 6 November 1996) is a Croatian professional ice hockey right winger.

Jarčov is also a member of the Croatian national team and most recently played in the qualifiers for the 2022 Winter Olympics.

References

https://www.eliteprospects.com/player/174260/luka-jarcov

External links

1996 births
Living people
KHL Sisak players
KHL Medveščak Zagreb players
Sportspeople from Zagreb
21st-century Croatian people